Julio Gracia Gallardo (born 10 February 1998) is a Spanish footballer who plays as a central midfielder for Murcia.

Club career
Born in El Saucejo, Seville, Andalusia, Gracia joined Real Betis' youth setup in 2013. He made his senior debut with the B-team on 22 August 2015, starting in a 1–0 Segunda División B home loss against Mérida AD.

Gracia scored his first senior goal on 11 September 2016, netting his team's last in a 3–1 away defeat of CD Alcalá. The following 15 March, he renewed his contract with the club.

Gracia made his first team – and La Liga – debut on 10 December 2017, coming on as a second-half substitute for Antonio Barragán in a 1–0 home loss against Atlético Madrid. The following 27 August, he joined FC Cartagena in the third division, on loan for one year.

On 15 July 2019, Gracia joined fellow third division side CD Badajoz on loan for the season. On 17 August of the following year, he moved to another reserve team, Getafe CF B in the same category.

References

External links

Beticopedia profile 

1998 births
Living people
People from Sierra Sur (Seville)
Sportspeople from the Province of Seville
Spanish footballers
Footballers from Andalusia
Association football midfielders
La Liga players
Segunda División B players
Tercera División players
Betis Deportivo Balompié footballers
Real Betis players
FC Cartagena footballers
CD Badajoz players
Getafe CF B players
Linares Deportivo footballers
Real Murcia players